Higor Ribeiro de Souza (born ) is a Brazilian futsal player who plays as a pivot for Corinthians and the Brazilian national futsal team.

References

External links
Liga Nacional de Futsal profile
The Final Ball profile

1998 births
Living people
Brazilian men's futsal players